Gelato (from Italian language: "Frozen", or "Icecream") is a hardware-accelerated, offline renderer created by graphics card manufacturer Nvidia. It was originally intended for use with its Quadro FX GPU, although a Quadro class GPU is no longer a requirement, as it now also supports GeForce cards. Designed to produce film-quality images, Gelato uses a shading language very similar to RenderMan's. Gelato was first released in April 2004. NVIDIA stated in May 2008 that it will no longer be developing or supporting the Gelato software products
.

With the release of Gelato 2.0, and in a push to popularize GPU accelerated rendering (as opposed to the traditional CPU rendering), Nvidia released a free version of Gelato for PCs. Some of the more advanced features on this version were locked out, such as those used for production rendering. This was done to encourage more professional users to purchase the full product. However, on 23 May 2008, Nvidia released Gelato Pro as a free download without any additional license. It does not come with support from Nvidia, but there are user forums.

History
The original renderer was priced at several thousand United States dollars (USD) per node. In order to boost the adoption of the product by a wider user base, in late 2006, Nvidia decided to split the product up into two versions, a free version called Gelato and a professional version called Gelato Pro, which sold for US$1,500 per render node. Gelato Pro is now also offered as a free download. The professional version includes the following extra features.

Nvidia Sorbetto interactive relighting technology
DSO shadeops 
Network parallel rendering 
Multithreading 
Native 64-bit support 
Maintenance and support

The whole 'Gelato Zone', including Gelato Pro 2.2, was removed from Nvidia's website around the end of July 2008, in favour of the new CUDA-based OptiX ray tracing engine.

See also

 Blue Moon Rendering Tools
 OpenImageIO

Notes and references

External links
 Official website
 Nvidia Gelato Blog

3D rendering software for Linux
Freeware 3D graphics software
Nvidia software
Proprietary freeware for Linux